The Smugglers was 1916 American silent comedy film produced by Famous Players Film Company and distributed through Paramount Pictures. It was directed by Sidney Olcott and starred stage star Donald Brian in his second film. The film is now considered lost with only a fragment (part of reel 2) surviving at the Library of Congress.

Cast

 Donald Brian as John Battleby Watts
 Alma Tell as Mrs. Watts
 Cyril Chadwick as Brompton
 Margaret Greene as Mrs. Brompton
 Harold Vosburgh as Detective Gray
 Rita Bori as Sally Atkins

References

External links

 
 
 The Smugglers website dedicated to Sidney Olcott

1916 films
1916 comedy films
Silent American comedy films
American silent feature films
American black-and-white films
Films directed by Sidney Olcott
Lost American films
Paramount Pictures films
1916 lost films
Lost comedy films
1910s American films